Frisk is a 1995 American drama film directed by Todd Verow, based on the 1991 novel of the same name by author Dennis Cooper. It is a first-person narrative about a serial killer. Dennis (Michael Gunther) describes a series of ritual murders in letters to his sometime lover and best friend Julian (Jaie Laplante) and Julian's younger brother Kevin (Raoul O'Connell), an object of desire to Dennis.

Verow once explained in an interview "we really need to concentrate on what makes us unique, what makes us interesting and what makes us dangerous".

It is banned in the UK due to its content. It was rejected by the BBFC in 1998, and although still banned in UK, it has been shown without a certificate at London's ICA cinema. It was the closing night attraction at the 1996 San Francisco International Lesbian and Gay Film Festival. When screened in Manhattan, several cinema viewers left during the violent scenes.

Bob Mould mooted scoring the film in 1993. Dennis Cooper's work, he said, "deals with a lot of fetishes and fantasies and free-floating imagery, which I like a lot. I've read the book. It's pretty harsh. It's pretty gay."

Cast
 Michael Gunther as Dennis
 Craig Chester as Henry
 Michael Stock as Uhrs
 Raoul O'Connell as Kevin
 Jaie Laplante as Julian
 Parker Posey as Ferguson
 James Lyons as Gypsy Pete
 Alexis Arquette as Punk (victim #3)
 Michael Waite as Gary
 Alyssa Wendt as Susan
 Mark Ewert as Young Dennis / Jan (victim #1) / Young Boy in park (victim #4)
 Dustin Schell as Snuff Photographer
 Michael Wilson as Party Goer
 Paul B. Riley as Party Goer
 Donald Mosner as Party Goer

Reviews
In 1996, Stephen Holden of the New York Times called the film "harshly repellent" and "realistic but messy style that might be called cold porn for its utter lack of erotic warmth". It is "meandering and narratively diffuse, but it is also disturbingly well acted".

References

External links
 

1995 films
Films based on American novels
American LGBT-related films
1995 LGBT-related films
1990s serial killer films
American serial killer films
American crime drama films
LGBT-related drama films
1995 crime drama films
1990s English-language films
1990s American films